Callosobruchus chinensis is a common species of beetle found in the bean weevil subfamily, and is known to be a pest to many stored legumes. Although it is commonly known as the adzuki bean weevil it is in fact not a true weevil, belonging instead to the leaf beetle family, Chrysomelidae.  Other common names include the pulse beetle, Chinese bruchid and cowpea bruchid. This species has a very similar lifestyle and habitat to Callosobruchus maculatus and their identities are often mistaken for each other. This beetle is a common pest targeting many different species of stored legumes and it is distributed across the tropical and subtropical regions of the world. C. chinensis is one of the most damaging crop pests to the stored legume industry due to their generalized legume diets and wide distribution.

The first recorded sighting and description of C. chinensis was in China which is where the beetle gets its species name.

Habitat and distribution
C. chinensis displays a cosmopolitan distribution pattern and has been spotted in most countries due to the commercial export of beans. The beetle's natural ranges are in the tropics and subtropics of Asia, and their population has grown extensively since the cultivation and distribution of legumes. Their distribution is heavily influenced by human production and they only live by legumes that are suitable for them to mate on and their larvae to feed on. Both the larvae and the adults feed on the legume.

Some of their common host plants include green gram, lentil, cowpea, pigeon pea, chickpea and other pea species though they are known to live on many more legume hosts.  The species' most preferred habitat is in the tropics, on green gram or chickpeas.

They reach the height of egg production and legume infestation in July–August.

Description
C. chinensis is a small insect, growing to be about 5 mm in length as an adult. Unlike true weevils, C. chinensis has no snout. The adult stage is described as being brown in colour with black and grey patches over the body. The abdomen of the female is slightly longer than the elytra and it is white in colour with two oval black spots on it. The adults are capable of flight and they can disperse to other fields and bean storage sites easily using this method.

This species exhibits some sexual dimorphism where the female is larger and heavier than the male beetle.  The antennae are pectinate in males while in females, the antennae are serrate.

The larvae are yellowish-whitish in color with reduced legs. The pupae are dark brown and pupation occurs inside the legume. The eggs occur singly and have a yellow coloring which become opaque when hatched. Their eggs become much smaller in areas of high population density to accommodate for competition of resources in the legume which results in smaller adults and less fit larvae.

Life history
The Adzuki bean weevil females lay their eggs directly on the surface of the legume singly and move on to either a different part of the legume or else to a different one depending on the bean density and competition among other females to lay more eggs. They can lay as many as 90 eggs after a single fertilization. Fecundity is relative to which legume is being used as a host and female fitness. The eggs usually hatch after 3–5 days and the new larvae will burrow into the bean for the rest of development.

The larvae chew tunnels through the bean until it is ready to pupate.

Mature adults emerge from the bean, biting a neat circular exit from the pod as soon as 25 days after hatching. The adult beetles live up to two weeks after emerging from the pupa.

Reproduction
Male C. chinensis have large genital sclerites located at the end of their intromittent organ. This is used to transfer sperm more effectively as they act as anchors attaching inside of the female genital opening. These sclerites do not appear to significantly damage the female reproductive tract as seen in similar species as these sclerites are less developed than those seen in species such as Callosobruchus maculatus. The male intromittent organ, when extended, can be almost twice the size of the beetle but only the tip of it is inserted inside the female during reproduction.

Behavior

Death feigning
C. chinensis shows has death feigning behavior as an anti-predatory technique. During this behavior, under certain stimulus that startles the insect, the beetle will roll onto its back and curl its legs up. This is likely to be used in order to dissuade parasitoid wasps from preying on the beetle.

Temperature has been shown to alter this behavior in adult beetles. As temperatures rise, this behavior becomes less common. A larger body size also has a decline in thanatosis.

Heterospecific copulation
C. chinensis males regularly attempt to copulate with female Callosobruchus maculatus. This is quite commonly observed in these insects as they are congeneric species of bean weevil with a major niche overlap. This behavior has been seen to reduce female fecundity in C. maculatus, though it is unclear as to why this happens. This indiscriminate heterospecific copulation behavior has been observed even when female C. chinensis are present.

See also
Callosobruchus maculatus

References

Bruchinae
Beetles described in 1758
Taxa named by Carl Linnaeus
Beetles of Asia